Gausi might refer to:

Antoni Gausí, Spanish footballer
Gausian dynasty, Lombardian clan